The 2019 European Mixed Team Badminton Championships was held in Copenhagen, Denmark, between 13–17 February 2019 and organised by Badminton Europe and Denmark's Badminton Union.

Qualification

Direct qualifiers
 (host country)

Qualification stage

The qualification stage was held between 7–9 December 2018 in 7 cities across Europe.

§: Subgroup's winner.

Group stage

Group 1

Group 2

Knockout stage

Semifinals

Final

References

2019
European Mixed Team Badminton Championships
2019 European Mixed Team Badminton Championships
European Mixed Team Badminton Championships
International sports competitions in Copenhagen
European Mixed Team Badminton Championships